Chander Kumar (born 8 May 1944) serving as Member of Legislative Assembly (MLA) from Jawali. Previously he was elected as MLA from  Guler constituency for 5 terms between 1983 and 2004. He also served as Minister in serving key portfolios like Higher Education, Health, Environment and so on. He represented the Kangra constituency of Himachal Pradesh as a Member of Parliament from 2004 to 2009.

Early political career 
Chander Kumar (born 8 May 1944) in Dhan, Kangra 

Qualifications:
 Bachelor of Arts (HPU)
 1966: Master Of Arts Geography (Punjab University)
 1967: M.Ed.
 1980: LLB (HPU)

Personal background 
He was married to Smt. Krishna Chaudhary on 2nd March 1976. His son Neeraj Bharti was Chief Parliamentary Secretary (Department of Education) elected from Jawali Constituency of district Kangra, Himachal Pradesh until 2017. His daughter in law Monika Bharti is former Congress Youth President (Himachal Pradesh).

In the November 2022 assembly elections, Kumar was the Indian National Congress candidate from Jawali constituency and won from Sanjay Guleria of the Bhartiya Janta party.

Books Published

Articles on land use planning, forests and environment Literary, Artistic & Scientific Accomplishments Himurja; handpump technology for hilly areas

Other Information

Was actively involved in the policy document of Himalayan Sustained Development of Ecology and Forestry Authority; Water- shed programme in the Himalayan Region including Hand pump Technology for driving water supply; Joint Convener, National Convention on Education; taught in St. Beed's College, Shimla, Himachal Pradesh; initiated reform measures for the improvement of higher and technical education in Himachal Pradesh; Vice Chairman, Himachal Pradesh Roadways Transport Corporation (HRTC) 1982-85

Political career 
Posts held

1951   Positions Held Secretary, Praja Socialist Party (P.S.P.), Distt. Ballia
1982-1984Minister of State, Agriculture and Forestry, Government of Himachal Pradesh
1984-1985 Minister of State, Forests, Government of Himachal Pradesh
1985-1989 Member, Committee on Energy Member, Himachal Pradesh Legislative Assembly (four terms)
1989-1990 Cabinet Minister, Power and Projects, Government of Himachal Pradesh
1993-1998   Cabinet Minister, Irrigation, Public Health, Science and Technology, Government of Himachal Pradesh
1998-1999 Cabinet Minister, Forest and Environment, Government of Himachal Pradesh
2003-2004 Member, Committee on Estimates Member, Committee on Official Language
2004 Elected to 14th Lok Sabha Member, Committee on Tourism Deputy Minister, Higher Education and Public Relations, Government of Himachal Pradesh
2007-2009 Member, Standing Committee on Energy
2022 onwards Member of Himachal Legislative assembly
2022  As Protem speaker of Himachal Legislative assembly
2022  Minister of State, Agriculture and Forestry, Animal Husbandry Government of Himachal Pradesh

References 

Indian National Congress politicians
India MPs 2004–2009
People from Kangra, Himachal Pradesh
1944 births
Living people
Lok Sabha members from Himachal Pradesh